Edgar Sulg (26 March 1891 Kirepi Parish, Tartu County – 29 November 1970 Montreal, Canada) was an Estonian politician. He was a member of III Riigikogu.

References

1891 births
1970 deaths
Members of the Riigikogu, 1926–1929